Dmitri Mikhailovich Bondarenko (born June 9, 1968) is a Russian anthropologist, historian, and Africanist. He has conducted field research in a number of African countries (particularly, Tanzania, Nigeria, Benin, Rwanda, Zambia, Uganda) and among Black people in Russia and the United States. He is Principal Research Fellow and Vice-Director for Research with the Institute for African Studies of the Russian Academy of Sciences, Director of the International Center of Anthropology of the National Research University Higher School of Economics, and Full Professor in Ethnology with the Center of Social Anthropology of the Russian State University for the Humanities. He holds the titles of Professor in Ethnology from the Lomonosov Moscow State University, Professor of the Russian Academy of Sciences in Global Problems and International Relations, and Corresponding Member of the Russian Academy of Sciences in History.

Bondarenko was a visiting scholar with the Northwestern University (United States), Institut für Geschichte (Germany), and Maison des sciences de l'homme (France). He has delivered guest lectures at universities of Russia, the United States, Egypt, Tanzania, Slovenia, Angola, and Uganda. Bondarenko is a member of the Executive Committee of the Africanist Network of the "European Association of Social Anthropologists", for which he also served as the Committee Chairperson in 2006–2008. Dmitri Bondarenko is a co-founder and co-editor of "Social Evolution & History".

Education 
Bondarenko graduated with the M.A. degree in 1990 from the Moscow State University, Department of Ethnography, School of History. He completed his Ph.D. in 1993 at Russian Academy of Sciences. He also holds Doctor of Sciences degree (2000) from the Russian Academy of Sciences.

Research interests and major contributions 
Social theory, anthropological and historical theory, political anthropology, pre-industrial societies, cultures and history of Africa, socio-cultural transformations and intercultural interaction in contemporary world (including ethnic, racial, and religious aspects, migration issues) with special focus on Africa and people of African descent worldwide

Bondarenko has introduced (together with Andrey Korotayev) and started elaborating the notion of homoarchy to be coupled with the one of heterarchy, noting that the heterarchy (defined as "the relation of elements to one another when they are unranked or when they possess the potential for being ranked in a number of different ways") is not the opposite of any hierarchy all together, but is rather the opposite of "homoarchy", defined as "the relation of elements to one another when they are rigidly ranked one way only, and thus possess no (or not more than very limited) potential for being unranked or ranked in another or a number of different ways at least without cardinal reshaping of the whole socio-political order".

Basing primarily on the precolonial Benin Kingdom evidence, Bondarenko has elaborated the conception of "megacommunity" as a specific type of the non-state supercomplex society, integration of a supercomplex (exceeding the complex chiefdom level) society on community (and hence non-state) basis being its main distinctive feature. He has contributed to the studies of the state origins and nature by dealing with such aspects of the problematics as the dynamics of kinship and territoriality as principles of socio-political organization, transformations in ideology, and others.

In publications on contemporary issues Bondarenko argues, in particular, that globalization should be viewed as a primarily cultural, not economic and political, phenomenon which is by no means a recently appeared one but which embraces essentially the whole human history, and which can turn out a "successful historical project" in the shape of a "federation of local civilizations" only.

Publications 
Bondarenko has authored over 500 publications including 8 individual monographs, 4 of which are in English:
 African Americans and American Africans: Migration, Histories, Race and Identities. Canon Pyon: Sean Kingston Publishing, 2019.
 The Axial Ages of World History: Lessons for the 21st Century. Litchfield Park, AZ: Emergent Publications, 2014 (with K. Baskin).
 Homoarchy as a Principle of Culture's Organization. The 13th-19th Centuries Benin Kingdom as a Non-State Supercomplex Society. Moscow: URSS, 2006.
 A Popular History of Benin. The Rise and Fall of a Mighty Forest Kingdom. Frankfurt am Main etc.: Peter Lang, 2003 (with P.M. Roese).
Among the volumes and journal special issues co-edited by Bondarenko are:
 The Evolution of Social Institutions: Interdisciplinary Perspectives . Cham: Springer, 2020 (Ed. with S.A. Kowalewski and D.B. Small).
 The Omnipresent Past. Historical Anthropology of Africa and African Diaspora. Moscow: LRC Publishing House, 2019.
 Plural Trajectories: Introduction to African Futures (Special Issue of Journal of the Institute for African Studies. 2019, № 2 [47]).
 State Building, States, and State Transformation in Africa (Special Issue of Social Evolution and History. 2018. Vol. 17, № 1).
 Anthropology, History, and Memory in Sub-Saharan Africa. In Memoriam Michel Izard (Special Issue of Social Evolution and History. 2014. Vol. 13, № 2).
 Alternativeness in Cultural History: Heterarchy and Homoarchy as Evolutionary Trajectories. Moscow: Center for Civilizational and Regional Studies Press, 2007.
 The Early State, Its Alternatives and Analogues. Volgograd: Uchitel’, 2004.
 Nomadic Pathways in Social Evolution. Moscow: Center for Civilizational and Regional Studies Press, 2003.
 Alternatives of Social Evolution. Vladivostok: FEB RAS, 2000.
 Civilizational Models of Politogenesis. Moscow: Institute for African Studies Press, 2000.

Notes

External links 
 Bondarenko's web-page
 Bondarenko's web-page
 Bondarenko's web-page
 Bondarenko's profile on Academia
 Bondarenko's profile on Researchgate
 Bondarenko's profile on Socionauki

1968 births
Living people
Russian anthropologists
Scholars of diaspora studies
21st-century Russian historians
Russian Africanists
Academic staff of the Russian State University for the Humanities
Moscow State University alumni
Russian ethnographers
Ethnographers
Scientists from Moscow
African diaspora studies scholars